The 16 May 1877 crisis was a constitutional crisis in the French Third Republic concerning the distribution of power between the president and the legislature. When the royalist president Patrice MacMahon dismissed the Opportunist Republican prime minister Jules Simon, the parliament on 16 May 1877 refused to support the new government and was dissolved by the president. New elections resulted in the royalists increasing their seat totals, but nonetheless resulted in a majority for the Republicans. Thus, the interpretation of the 1875 Constitution as a parliamentary system prevailed over a presidential system. The crisis ultimately sealed the defeat of the royalist movement, and was instrumental in creating the conditions for the longevity of the Third Republic.

Background 
Following the Franco-Prussian War, the elections for the National Assembly had brought about a monarchist majority, divided into Legitimists and Orleanists, which conceived the republican institutions created by the fall of Napoleon III in 1870 as a transitory state while they negotiated who would be king. Until the 1876 elections, the royalist movement dominated the legislature, thus creating the paradox of a Republic led by anti-republicans. The royalist deputies supported Marshal MacMahon, a declared monarchist of the legitimist party, as president of the Republic. His term was set to seven years – the time to find a compromise between the two rival royalist factions.

In 1873, a plan to place Henri, comte de Chambord, the head of the Bourbon branch supported by Legitimists, back on the throne had failed on account of the comte's intransigence. President MacMahon was supposed to lead him to the National Assembly and have him acclaimed as king. However, the Comte de Chambord rejected this plan in the white flag manifesto of 5 July 1871, reiterated by a 23 October 1873 letter, in which he explained that in no case would he abandon the white flag, symbol of the monarchy (with its fleur-de-lis), in exchange for the republican tricolor. Chambord believed the restored monarchy had to eliminate all traces of the Revolution, especially the Tricolor flag, in order to restore the unity between the monarchy and the nation, which the revolution had sundered. Compromise on this was impossible if the nation were to be made whole again.  The general population, however, was unwilling to abandon the Tricolor flag.  Chambord's decision thus ruined the hopes of a quick restoration of the monarchy. Monarchists therefore resigned themselves to wait for the death of the ageing, childless Chambord, when the throne could be offered to his more liberal heir, the Comte de Paris. A "temporary" republican government was therefore established. Chambord lived on until 1883, but by that time, enthusiasm for a monarchy had faded, and the Comte de Paris was never offered the French throne.

In 1875, Adolphe Thiers joined with the initiative of moderate Republicans Jules Ferry and Léon Gambetta to vote for the constitutional laws of the Republic. The next year, the elections were won by the Republicans, although the end result was contradictory:

in the Senate, which gave disproportionate influence to rural areas, the majority was made up of monarchists, who had a majority of only one seat (151 against 149 Republicans)
in the Chamber of Deputies, the overwhelming majority was composed of republicans.
the president was MacMahon, an avowed monarchist.

Political crisis was thus inevitable. It involved a struggle for supremacy between the monarchist President of the Republic and the republican Chamber of Deputies.

The crisis 
The crisis was triggered by President MacMahon, who dismissed the moderate republican Jules Simon, head of the government, and substituted him with a new "Ordre moral" government led by the Orleanist Albert, duc de Broglie. MacMahon favoured a presidential government, while the Republicans in the chamber considered the parliament as the supreme political body, which decided the policies of the nation.

The Chamber refused to place its trust in the new government. On 16 May 1877, 363 French deputies – among them Georges Clemenceau, Jean Casimir-Perier and Émile Loubet – passed a vote of no confidence (Manifeste des 363).

MacMahon dissolved the parliament and called for new elections, which brought 323 Republicans and 209 royalists to the Chamber, marking a clear rejection of the President's move. MacMahon had either to submit himself or to resign, as had Léon Gambetta famously called for: "When France will have let its sovereign voice heard, then one will have to submit himself or resign" (se soumettre ou se démettre) MacMahon thus appointed a moderate republican, Jules Armand Dufaure as president of the Council, and accepted Dufaure's interpretation of the constitution:

ministers are responsible to the Chamber of Deputies (following the 1896 institutional crisis, the Senate obtained the right to control ministers)
the right of dissolution of parliament must remain exceptional. It was not used again during the Third Republic; even Philippe Pétain did not dare to dissolve it in 1940.

Aftermath 
The crisis sealed the defeat of the royalists. President MacMahon accepted his defeat and resigned in January 1879. The Comte de Chambord, whose intransigence had resulted in the breakdown of the alliance between Legitimists and Orleanists, died in 1883, after which several Orleanists rallied to the Republic, quoting Adolphe Thiers' words that "the Republic is the form of government which divides [the French] the least". These newly rallied became the first right-wing republicans of France. After World War I (1914–18), some of the independent radicals and members of the right-wing of the late Radical-Socialist Party allied themselves with these pragmatic republicans, although anticlericalism remained a gap between these long-time rivals (and indeed continues, to be a main criterion of distinction between the French left-wing and its right-wing).

In the constitutional field, the presidential system was definitely rejected in favor of a parliamentary system, and the right of dissolution of parliament severely restricted, so much that it was never used again under the Third Republic. After the Vichy regime, the Fourth Republic (1946–1958) was again founded on this parliamentary system, something which Charles de Gaulle despised and rejected (le régime des partis). Thus, when de Gaulle had the opportunity to come back to power in the crisis of May 1958, he designed a constitution that strengthened the President. His 1962 reform to have the president elected by direct universal suffrage (instead of being elected by deputies and senators) further increased his authority. The constitution designed by de Gaulle for the Fifth Republic (since 1958) specifically tailored his needs, but this specificity was also rested on the President's personal charisma.

Even with de Gaulle's disappearance from the political scene a year after the May 1968 crisis, little changed until the 1980s, when the various cohabitations under President François Mitterrand renewed the conflict between the presidency and the prime minister. Subsequently President Jacques Chirac proposed to reduce the term of the presidency from seven to five years (the quinquennat), so that both presidential and parlementary elections may be synchronous, in order  to avoid any further "cohabitation" and thus conflict between the executive and legislative branches.  This change was accepted by referendum in 2000.

See also 
Cohabitation (government)
French Third Republic (1871–1940)
France in the nineteenth century

References

Further reading
 Brogan, D.W. France Under the Republic: The Development of Modern France (1870–1939) (1940) pp 127–43.
 Mitchell, Allan. "Thiers, MacMahon, and the Conseil superieur de la Guerre." French historical studies 6.2 (1969): 232–252.

French Third Republic
Political history of France
1877 in France
France
France
France
Prince Philippe, Count of Paris